Woongarra is a locality in the Bundaberg Region, Queensland, Australia.

History 
The name Woongarra is an Aboriginal word meaning the brigalow tree.

Woongarra State School was originally located on Wallace's Road and Lovers Walk Road when it opened on 13 August 1879. It moved to its present location on Elliott Heads Road in 1901.

A Primitive Methodist Church opened circa August 1878.

St John's Anglican church was dedicated on 14 October 1883. It held its last service on 29 October 1967 because of a declining population.

Education 
Woongarra State School is a government primary (Prep-6) school for boys and girls at 468 Elliott Heads Road. In 2017, the school had an enrolment of 459 students with 36 teachers (31 full-time equivalent) and 25 non-teaching staff (15 full-time equivalent). A special education program is available at the school.

References 

Bundaberg Region
Localities in Queensland